The East Broad Street Historic District in Columbus, Ohio is a historic district that was listed on the National Register of Historic Places in 1987.  The district includes the section of East Broad Street from Ohio Avenue on the west to Monypenny Street on the east.  It includes lavish residences, some converted to offices.

Contributing structures
Contributing buildings include:

1160-1190 E. Broad St. (Governor's Terrace Apartments)
1234 E. Broad St. (Old Governor's Mansion), 2A) garage. 2B) gardener's quarters
1266 E. Broad St. (Joseph F. Firestone House, demolished)
Northwest corner of E. Broad St. and Winner (service station, demolished)
1312 E. Broad (Broadwin Apartments)
1354 E. Broad St. (Temple Tifereth Israel)
1400 E. Broad St. and carriage house/garage (Dr. Baker Residence)
1414 E. Broad St. and garage
1428 E. Broad St. and garage
1440 E. Broad St. and garage (Frederick Shedd house)
1450 E. Broad St. and garage
1500 E. Broad St. (East High School)
1544 E. Broad St.
1550 E. Broad St.
1560 E. Broad St.
1640 E. Broad St. and garage
1654 E. Broad St.
1660 E. Broad St.
1688 E. Broad St. and garage
1700 E. Broad St. and garage
1706 E. Broad St.
1720 E. Broad St.
1728 E. Broad St.
1776 E. Broad St. and 1780 E. Broad St. (Volunteers of America offices)
1790-98 E. Broad St., 8-44-N. Brunson, 1784-1801 E. Long St. (the Broad-Brunson Place Condominiums)
1485-89 E. Broad St.
1475-1481 E. Broad St.
1471 E. Broad St.
1465 E. Broad St. and garage
1445 E. Broad St. (Royal York Apartments)
1415 E. Broad St. (Matthew J. Bergin House)
1349 E. Broad St. and garage
1339 E. Broad St.
1319 E. Broad St. and garage
1313 E. Broad St.
1293 E. Broad St. and garage
17-19 Wilson Ave.
1277 E. Broad St. and garage
1271 E. Broad St.
1263-65 E. Broad St.

See also
National Register of Historic Places listings in Columbus, Ohio

References

External links
 

Neighborhoods in Columbus, Ohio
National Register of Historic Places in Columbus, Ohio
Queen Anne architecture in Ohio
Historic districts on the National Register of Historic Places in Ohio
1987 establishments in Ohio
Historic districts in Columbus, Ohio
Broad Street (Columbus, Ohio)